Andrea Tesoniero (born 28 January 1988) is an Italian footballer who plays as a goalkeeper.

Career
Born in Vallo della Lucania, Campania, Tesoniero started his career at Melfi. In the 2005–06 season, he left for Arezzo, but subsequently left the club for Ternana mid-season. He then left for Serie D club Arrone in the 2007–08 season. He then played with Potenza for two seasons.

After the club's bankruptcy, he signed a 2-year contract with Barletta in 2010. He was the team's first choice goalkeeper, ahead Giuseppe Di Masi and Renato Dossena, until he was injured. He was released on 30 August 2011.

References

Italian footballers
S.S. Arezzo players
Ternana Calcio players
Potenza S.C. players
A.S.D. Barletta 1922 players
Association football midfielders
Sportspeople from the Province of Salerno
1988 births
Living people
Footballers from Campania